Waterford City was a constituency represented in the Irish House of Commons from 1264 to 1800. Following the Act of Union of 1800 the borough retained one seat.

Borough
This constituency was based in the city of Waterford in County Waterford. It was incorporated by charter in 1264 with freeholders and freemen.

Members of Parliament

Elections

See also
Irish House of Commons 
List of Irish constituencies

References

Sources
 Johnston-Liik, E. M. (2002). History of the Irish Parliament, 1692–1800, Publisher: Ulster Historical Foundation (28 Feb 2002), on line 
T. W. Moody, F. X. Martin, F. J. Byrne, A New History of Ireland 1534-1691, Oxford University Press, 1978

Constituencies of the Parliament of Ireland (pre-1801)
Historic constituencies in County Waterford
History of Waterford (city)
Politics of Waterford (city)
1264 establishments in Ireland
1800 disestablishments in Ireland
Constituencies established in 1264
Constituencies disestablished in 1800